3-Hydroxyphencyclidine (3-HO-PCP) is a dissociative of the arylcyclohexylamine class related to phencyclidine (PCP) that has been sold online as a designer drug.

Pharmacology
3-HO-PCP acts as a high-affinity uncompetitive antagonist of the NMDA receptor via the dizocilpine (MK-801) site (Ki = 30 nM). It has much higher affinity than PCP for this site (Ki = 250 nM, for comparison; 8-fold difference). The drug also has high affinity for the μ-opioid receptor (MOR) (Ki = 39–60 nM) in animal test subjects, the κ-opioid receptor (KOR) (Ki = 140 nM), and the sigma σ1 receptor (Ki = 42 nM; IC50 = 19 nM), whereas it has only low affinity for the δ-opioid receptor (Ki = 2,300 nM). The high affinity of 3-HO-PCP for opioid receptors is unique among arylcyclohexylamines and is in contrast to PCP, which has only very low affinity for the MOR (Ki = 11,000–26,000 nM; 282- to 433-fold difference) and the other opioid receptors (Ki = 4,100 nM for the KOR and 73,000 nM for the DOR).

Although it was hypothesized that 3-HO-PCP might be a metabolite of PCP in humans, there is no evidence that this is the case.

Chemistry
3-HO-PCP is an arylcyclohexylamine. Close analogues of 3-HO-PCP include PCP, 3-MeO-PCP, 4-MeO-PCP, 3-MeO-PCMo, and somewhat more distantly ketamine, methoxyketamine, 3-MeO-PCE, methoxetamine and dimetamine.

Society and culture

Legal status
On October 18, 2012 the Advisory Council on the Misuse of Drugs in the United Kingdom released a report about methoxetamine, saying that the "harms of methoxetamine are commensurate with Class B of the Misuse of Drugs Act (1971)", despite the fact that the act does not classify drugs based on harm. The report went on to suggest that all analogues of MXE should also become class B drugs and suggested a catch-all clause covering both existing and unresearched arylcyclohexamines, including 3-HO-PCP.

3-HO-PCP is banned in Sweden and Switzerland.

See also 
 2-FDCK
 4-Keto-PCP
 Delucemine
 Desmetramadol
 Hydroxetamine
 Dimetamine

References

Arylcyclohexylamines
Designer drugs
Dissociative drugs
NMDA receptor antagonists
Opioid modulators
Phenols
1-Piperidinyl compounds
Sigma receptor ligands
Synthetic opioids